Roger Colly (by 1532 – c. 1589) was the member of the Parliament of England for Marlborough for the parliament of March 1553.

References 

1530s births
1580s deaths
Members of Parliament for Marlborough
English MPs 1553 (Edward VI)
Year of birth uncertain
Year of death uncertain